= Robert Normoyle =

Irish Gaelic footballer

Robert Normoyle (2 August 1866 – 12 June 1933) was an Irish Gaelic footballer. His career with the Limerick senior team spanned the early years of the championship.
